The Asteroid Impact and Deflection Assessment (AIDA) missions are a proposed pair of space probes which will study and demonstrate the kinetic effects of crashing an impactor spacecraft into an asteroid moon. The mission is intended to test and validate impact models of whether a spacecraft could successfully deflect an asteroid on a collision course with Earth.

The original plan called for a European spacecraft, the Asteroid Impact Mission (AIM), to operate in synergy with a large NASA impactor called Double Asteroid Redirection Test (DART) and observe the immediate effects of the impact. AIM was cancelled in 2016 when Germany was unable to fund its portion, and after some backlash within European Space Agency (ESA), AIM was replaced in 2018 with a smaller spacecraft called Hera that will launch five years after DART to orbit and study the crater on the asteroid. Hera will also deploy two European CubeSats in deep space for close-up asteroid surveying: Juventas and Milani.

DART impacted Dimorphos, the asteroid moonlet of 65803 Didymos, on 26 September 2022. Hera will arrive at Didymos in December 2026, four years and three months after DART impact.

History 

Initially, Hera role was to be realized by a much larger spacecraft called Asteroid Impact Mission (AIM), that would have observed the plume, the crater, and the freshly exposed material to provide unique information for asteroid deflection, science and mining communities. In December 2016, the European Space Agency (ESA) cancelled the development of the AIM spacecraft after Germany decided to fund the ExoMars project only. Germany offered to cover only 35 million of the 60 million needed for the AIM portion to continue, and this was not enough to continue development. Had AIM been developed, its notional requirements in 2012 were:
 an asteroid lander (based on the German MASCOT heritage) for in-situ measurements
 a thermal infrared imager to discriminate different surface properties like rocks or granular surfaces
 a monostatic high frequency radar to obtain information on the structure of the asteroid's surface
 a bistatic low frequency radar (on the orbiter and on the lander) to allow a view inside the asteroid and obtain data on its inner structure
 two interplanetary CubeSats
 deep-space optical communication.

Under the original proposal, AIM would have launched in October 2020, and DART in July 2021. AIM would have orbited the larger asteroid and studied the composition of it and its moon. DART would then impact the asteroid's moon in October 2022, during a close approach to Earth. AIM would have studied the asteroid's strength, surface physical properties and internal structure, as well as measured the effect on the asteroid moon's orbit around the larger asteroid.

Nevertheless, NASA has continued development of the DART mission to 65803 Didymos and plans to measure the effects of the impact from ground-based telescopes, and from an Italian CubeSat DART will bring along. Following AIM's cancellation, ESA director Jan Wörner stated his intentions to revive the European mission in some form. Etienne Schneider, Luxembourg's deputy prime minister, expressed regret at AIM's cancellation, and commented that his country would continue to advocate for the realization of the mission.

Status 
By March 2018, Hera proposal was in Phase B1, where the preliminary design was being drawn up. On 7 January 2019, the Hera team announced the selection of two CubeSats to piggyback on the mission: APEX and Juventas. ESA officials approved Hera in November 2019 for a 2024 launch. In September 2020 ESA awarded a contract covering the detailed design, manufacturing, and testing of Hera. In this occasion the APEX CubeSat is also substituted by the Milani one, named after the late Andrea Milani, distinguished professor and leading asteroid scientist.

The Italian Space Agency (ASI) decided in 2018 to contribute to NASA a secondary spacecraft called LICIACube (Light Italian CubeSat for Imaging of Asteroids), a 6-unit CubeSat that piggybacked with DART and separated 15 days before impact on 11 September 2022 to acquire images of the ejecta as it drifts past the asteroid. LICIACube is equipped with two optical science cameras, dubbed LUKE and LEIA.

Collaboration 
The AIDA mission is a joint international collaboration of the European Space Agency (ESA), the German Aerospace Center (DLR), Côte d'Azur Observatory (OCA), NASA, and Johns Hopkins University Applied Physics Laboratory (JHU/APL).

The miniature lidar instrument on board Hera will be provided by a consortium of teams from Portugal, Poland, and Ireland. Two CubeSats will be deployed by Hera while at Didymos: The Milani CubeSat is being developed by Italy, Czech Republic, Finland. The Juventas CubeSat is being developed by GomSpace and GMV's Romanian division.

Along with surveying DART impact crater, Hera may also carry a Japanese impactor that would be a replica of the Small Carry-on Impactor (SCI), on board the Hayabusa2 asteroid sample return mission. NASA's DART brought a 6U flyby CubeSat along with it, called LICIACube, which was developed by the Italian Space Agency (ASI) to image the ejecta plume.

DART and LICIACube

DART or Double Asteroid Redirection Test was a  impactor that hosted a single camera, Didymos Reconnaissance and Asteroid Camera for Optical Navigation (DRACO), derived from LORRI camera aboard New Horizons, to support autonomous guiding to impact the center of the moon of Didymos B. It also carried an Italian-built cubesat called LICIACube that was released pre-impact on 11 September 2022 to image the event. It is estimated that the impact of the  DART at  will produce a velocity change on the order of 0.4 mm/s, which leads to a small change in the orbit of Didymos B, but over time, a large change in the orbital position (or orbital phase). DART impacted Dimorphos on 26 September 2022.

Hera

Hera is the European component of the ESA–NASA AIDA mission. The Hera spacecraft, approved on 29 November 2019, will focus on key measurements to validate impact and asteroid deflection models such as the detailed characterisation of the impact crater made by the DART impactor. Hera will also measure the DART impact outcome, such as change in the binary system orbit, and will enable detailed characterisation of the Dimorphos volume and surface properties, as well as measure the volume and morphology of the DART impact crater.

The baseline payload of Hera includes a camera, a miniaturized lidar and two CubeSats dedicated to asteroid characterisation. Other options, such as a small lander, are being considered. Hera will be launched on an Falcon 9 in 2024.

Proposed payload 
The notional payloads on Hera are:
 Asteroid Framing Camera to obtain information on the dynamics of a binary asteroid and physical characteristics.
 Lidar laser altimeter to measure the shapes of the two bodies and constrain the mass of the asteroid's moon.
 Thermal imager
 Milani is a 6-unit CubeSat carrying the ASPECT visual and near-IR imaging spectrometer and VISTA for dust characterization. Milani will study the binary system surface composition and perform technology demonstration experiments related to the Inter-Satellite Link (ISL) and autonomous optical navigation. The CubeSat will operate for 3–6 months in the vicinity of the system.
 Juventas is a 6-unit CubeSat carrying a camera and a low-frequency radar (JuRa), for determining the internal structure of Dimorphos. It will operate for 3–6 months near the asteroid. At the end of its mission, it will attempt a landing on the surface of Dimorphos to obtain close-up data.
 An optional impactor may also be carried by Hera. It would be a replica of the Japan's Small Carry-on Impactor (SCI) on board the Hayabusa2 asteroid sample return mission. By performing a secondary impact (the primary impact being DART), a comparison of the effects posed by two collisions of different nature on the same asteroid can be realized, helping validate numerical impact algorithms and scaling laws.

Mission design 

AIDA will target 65803 Didymos, a binary asteroid system in which one asteroid is orbited by a smaller one. Didymos is not an Earth-crossing asteroid, and there is no possibility that the deflection experiment could create an impact hazard to Earth.

The impact of the  DART spacecraft at 6.25 km/s will produce a velocity change on the order of 0.4 mm/s, which leads to a significant change in the mutual orbit of these two objects, but only a minimal change in the heliocentric orbit of the system. AIDA will provide a great benefit obtaining the size of the resulting impact crater in addition to the momentum transfer measurement, as the effects of porosity and strength of the target are needed to calculate the momentum transfer efficiency.

DART impacted the small moon of the asteroid Didymos on 26 September 2022, while Hera would arrive at Didymos in 2027, five years after DART impact. To maximize scientific outcome, the AIDA team had proposed to delay DART launch so that Hera would arrive at the asteroid first, enabling it to study DART impact, the plume, the crater, and the freshly exposed material. While most of the initial objectives of AIDA would still be met if Hera arrives after DART, as a drawback, data from direct observation of the impact and ejecta will not be obtained.

AIDA mission architecture

See also 

 Asteroid impact avoidance
 B612 Foundation
 Don Quijote, AIDA's predecessor proposal
 The Spaceguard Foundation

References

External links 
 ESA Hera page
 Hera community page
 JAXA Hera page
 Sciency Words: Didymoon
 Video: 5 min presentation of AIDA, at YouTube.
 Video: 4 min presentation of Hera, at YouTube

Impactor spacecraft
Missions to asteroids
Planetary defense
Proposed space probes
Technology demonstrations
2024 in spaceflight